Perry Lynn Carter (born August 15, 1971) is a former American football defensive back for the Kansas City Chiefs and the Oakland Raiders in the  National Football League. He also played in the Canadian Football League for four seasons with the Edmonton Eskimos, Montreal Alouettes, and BC Lions while winning a Grey Cup championship with the Alouettes in 2002. He was drafted by the Arizona Cardinals in the 4th round of the 1994 NFL Draft. He played college football at the University of Southern Mississippi. He is the former assistant defensive backs coach for the Houston Texans.

External links
Perry Carter stats

1971 births
Living people
People from McComb, Mississippi
American football defensive backs
Southern Miss Golden Eagles football players
Kansas City Chiefs players
Oakland Raiders players
Edmonton Elks players
Montreal Alouettes players
BC Lions players
Hamburg Sea Devils coaches
Houston Texans coaches
Texas A&M–Commerce Lions football coaches
North Texas Mean Green football coaches
Texas Tech Red Raiders football coaches
Louisiana–Monroe Warhawks football coaches